Hrushikesh Naik is a politician from Odisha, India. He represents the Patna (Odisha Vidhan Sabha constituency) since the year 2014.

He is the chairperson of District Planning Committee (DPC) of Kendujhar District.

References

Members of the Odisha Legislative Assembly
People from Kendujhar district
Biju Janata Dal politicians
Living people
Year of birth missing (living people)